A system of roadside signage developed by the Pennsylvania Department of Highways just after the First World War, the iconic Keystone Markers could be found at the entrance to every Pennsylvania town, borough and city.  Variations of the marker could be found at highway crossings of creeks, rivers, trails, borough lines, and other points of interest.

Overview 
The Keystone Markers were products of the height of the Good Roads Movement that opened highway travel to the masses.  The Keystone Markers were the signature project of the Department, the second oldest of its kind in the nation and predecessor to today's PennDOT.   The proliferation of the familiar blue-and-yellow, cast iron Keystone Markers popularized Pennsylvania's reputation as the "Keystone State".

While Pennsylvania once claimed thousands of Keystone Markers, approximately 600 remain. The loss of the Markers prompted Preservation Pennsylvania, the Commonwealth's statewide heritage preservation advocacy organization, to include the Keystone Markers among their most endangered resources in 2011. Keystone Markers associated with towns are the most common of the survivors.  In each municipality where the markers were installed, at least two were put up, one on each end of town along the principal roadway. If a town was at the intersection of two such roadways, there were four signs installed, two on each road. Markers for towns indicated the name of the town, the reason why the town was given that name, and the date founded.  Many town Keystone Markers indicated the distance to the next town in the upper part of the sign.  Thus, each marker for a given town was unique.

Varieties 
There are three different varieties of Keystone Markers, each generally associated with a different kind of use.
 Front-mount, single-sided sign markers used for towns. These markers have signs that mount on the front of a specially-designed post. 
 Top-mount, dual-sided sign markers used for streams/creeks/rivers. These have a two-sided sign and mount on top of a specially-designed post that differs from the town marker post.  
 Keystone Variant Markers used for borough lines, trails, points of interest, directions, county and local roads, etc.  They use the same post as the town markers but have a slightly differently-shaped sign.

Keystone Marker Trust 

A non-profit advocacy organization called the Keystone Marker Trust is working with PennDOT and municipalities across the Commonwealth to restore existing Keystone Markers.  Grant funding has enabled patterns to be created and the first replica Keystone Markers are slated to be installed in 2012. The co-founders of the trust are attorney and employee of the National Railway Historical Society Nathaniel Guest and historian Greg Prichard.

Gallery 
Historically accurate

Damaged or out of place

References

External links

Keystone Marker Trust

Pennsylvania state historical markers
Transportation in Pennsylvania
Signage